Brooklyn Arts Press (BAP) is an independent publisher of poetry, literary fiction, non-fiction, art books, and music. The company was founded in 2007 by writer Joe Pan (formerly Joe Millar) in Brooklyn, New York. In 2015, the small press was compared to Radiohead and Louis CK for running a promotional sale that allowed readers to pay whatever they wanted for a new Noah Eli Gordon paperback book, leading to local and international speculation as to whether the campaign would be instrumental in changing how poetry books are sold in the US. In 2016, Daniel Borzutzky's book The Performance of Becoming Human, published by BAP that April, won the National Book Award for Poetry.

History
Brooklyn Arts Press, or BAP, began with the self-publication of Joe Pan's first book, Autobiomythography & Gallery, after his debut manuscript was named a finalist for several major poetry contests, including the Yale Series of Younger Poets Competition, the Academy of American Poets’ Walt Whitman Award, and the National Poetry Series. The book went on to be named “Best First Book of the Year” by Coldfront Magazine, and allowed BAP to begin publishing more books. While the recession halted production in 2008 and 2009, in 2010, the publishing company soon “broke the barrier where each book pays for the next."

Since then, the small press has published between 9-12 books per year, including Christopher Hennessy's Love-In-Idleness, which was a finalist for the Thom Gunn Award in 2012.

On June 1, 2017 Brooklyn Arts Press will release the debut LP from Brooklyn indie-rock trio Tuff Sunshine.

Notable Authors
Anselm Berrigan
Alexander Boldizar
Daniel Borzutzky (National Book Award Winner)
Noah Eli Gordon
Carol Guess
Michael Ernest Sweet

References

External links

Publishing companies established in 2007
Book publishing companies based in New York (state)
Companies based in Brooklyn